Antillio Bastian (born 20 May 1988) is a Bahamian sprinter triple jumper and long jumper from Nassau, Bahamas. He attended St Johns College in Nassau, before going on to compete for Dickinson State University and University of South Florida.

Bastian competed at the 2008 NACAC Under-23 Championships in Athletics and the 2010 NACAC Under-23 Championships in Athletics.

Bastian was also a part of the Bahamas 4x100 m relay team at the 2013 Penn Relays. The team was trying to qualify for the 2013 World Athletics Championships in Moscow, Russia.

Bastian would also go on to win the 200m at the 2011 Big East Outdoor Track and Field Championships.

Personal bests

References

External links
World Athletics Bio
USF Bio

1988 births
Living people
Bahamian male sprinters
Sportspeople from Nassau, Bahamas
People from Nassau, Bahamas
University of South Florida alumni
South Florida Bulls athletes
South Florida Bulls men's track and field athletes
Dickinson State University alumni
Bahamian male triple jumpers
Bahamian male long jumpers